An Examination of Being is the second studio album of Tampa based blackened death metal band, Order of Ennead. It was recorded at AudioHammer Studios in Sanford, Florida with producer Mark Lewis.

Track listing

Personnel 
 Steve Asheim – drums, percussion
 Kevin Quirion – vocals, rhythm guitar
 Scott Patrick – bass guitar
 John Li – lead guitar

References

Earache Records albums
2010 albums
Order of Ennead albums
Albums produced by Mark Lewis (music producer)